Khandwa Lok Sabha constituency is one of the 29 Lok Sabha constituencies in the Indian state of Madhya Pradesh. This Khandwa constituency came into existence in 1957. It covers the entire Burhanpur district and parts of Dewas, Khandwa and Khargone districts.

Vidhan Sabha segments
Presently, since the delimitation of the parliamentary and legislative assembly constituencies in 2008, Khandwa (खण्डवा) Lok Sabha constituency comprises the following eight Vidhan Sabha (Legislative Assembly) segments:

Members of Lok Sabha

^ by-poll

Election results

2021 Bypoll

General Elections 2019

General Elections 2009

General Elections 1977
 Parmanand Thakurdas Govindjiwala (Janata) : 182,031
 Gangacharan Dixit (INC) : 128,008

Bye-poll 1979
 Kushabhau Thakre (JNP) : 192,280
 S.N.Thakur (INC-I) : 153,794

General Elections 1971
 Gangacharan Dikshit (Indian National Congress) : 143,124 votes
 Virendra Kumar Anand (Bharatiya Jana Sangh) : 102,234

See also
 Khandwa district
 List of Constituencies of the Lok Sabha

References

Lok Sabha constituencies in Madhya Pradesh
Khandwa district